Ermanno Ioriatti (born 4 October 1975) is an Italian former speed skater. He competed at the 1998, 2002, 2006 and the 2010 Winter Olympics.

References

External links
 

1975 births
Living people
Italian male speed skaters
Olympic speed skaters of Italy
Speed skaters at the 1998 Winter Olympics
Speed skaters at the 2002 Winter Olympics
Speed skaters at the 2006 Winter Olympics
Speed skaters at the 2010 Winter Olympics
Sportspeople from Trento
Speed skaters of Fiamme Oro
20th-century Italian people
21st-century Italian people